Overnight Sensation is an album by Motörhead.

Overnight Sensation may also refer to:
 Over-Nite Sensation, a 1973 album by Frank Zappa
 "Overnight Sensation" (song), a 1975 song written by Bob McDill and recorded by Mickey Gilley
 "Overnight Sensation (Hit Record)", a 1974 song by the Raspberries
 "Overnight Sensation", a 1990 song by FireHouse from their debut album FireHouse
 Overnight Sensation (film), a 1932 German comedy film
 "Overnight Sensation", a 2021 song by American singer-songwriter Lily Rose

See also
 Overnight Sensational, a 2006 album by Sam Moore